Prince Luigi Amedeo, Duke of the Abruzzi, (29 January 1873 – 18 March 1933) was an Italian mountaineer and explorer, briefly Infante of Spain as son of Amadeo I of Spain, member of the royal House of Savoy and cousin of the Italian King Victor Emmanuel III. He is known for his Arctic explorations and for his mountaineering expeditions, particularly to Mount Saint Elias and K2. He also served as an Italian admiral during World War I. He created Villaggio Duca degli Abruzzi in Italian Somalia during his last years of life.

Early years
He was born in Madrid, Spain as the third oldest son of Prince Amadeo of Savoy, Duke of Aosta and his first wife Donna Maria Vittoria dal Pozzo della Cisterna. Prince Luigi Amedeo was a grandson of King Vittorio Emanuele II of Italy. He was born during his father's brief reign as King Amadeo of Spain. His siblings are Prince Emanuele Filiberto, Prince Vittorio Emanuele, and Prince Umberto. Shortly after his birth, his father, who had reigned in Spain since 1870, abdicated and returned to Italy in 1873. Prince Luigi Amedeo was a member of the House of Savoy, well known in Europe since the 12th century. His uncle became King Umberto I of Italy in 1878, and his cousin became King Vittorio Emanuele III in 1900.

The title Duke of the Abruzzi (Italian: Duca degli Abruzzi) was created by King Umberto I in 1890 for Luigi Amedeo, who was a son of the abdicating King of Spain Amadeus and initially was given the title of Infante of Spain. His ducal title referred to the central Italian region of Abruzzo.

From 1893 to 1896, Luigi Amedeo traveled around the world, including Eritrea, then an Italian possession, and Vancouver. In September 1893, he traveled to Italian Somaliland to quell the unrest and stayed for a month to guard the port of Mogadishu, giving him his first contact with a land to which he would later devote the last years of his life and in which he would choose to die. He had begun to train as a mountaineer in 1892 on Mont Blanc and Monte Rosa (Italian Alps): in 1897 he made the first ascent of Mount Saint Elias (Canada/U.S., 5,489 m). There the expedition searched for a mirage, known as the Silent City of Alaska, that natives and prospectors claimed to see over a glacier. C. W. Thornton, a member of the expedition, wrote: "It required no effort of the imagination to liken it to a city, but was so distinct that it required, instead, faith to believe that it was not in reality a city."

Another witness wrote in The New York Times: "We could plainly see houses, well-defined streets, and trees. Here and there rose tall spires over huge buildings which appeared to be ancient mosques or cathedrals."

Arctic expedition
In 1898, Prince Luigi Amedeo organized an expedition towards the North Pole and consulted the famous polar explorer Fridtjof Nansen that had sailed the furthest north with the Colin Archer-built polar ship  in 1893–1896. In 1899 Amedeo acquired , a steam whaler of 570 tons. He renamed her Stella Polare and took her to Colin Archer's shipyard in Larvik, Norway. The interior was stripped out and beams, diagonals and knees heavily strengthened the ship.

In spring 1899 he arrived in the Norwegian capital Christiania (the present day Oslo) with ten companions and Stella Polare ("Pole Star") took the expedition through the frozen sea. On 12 June they headed for Archangel (Arkhangelsk).

On 30 June Stella Polare dropped anchor in the docks of Arkhangelsk and the duke was solemnly received by governor Engelhardt. The same day, Prince Luigi Amedeo was invited to meet the local authorities and the present foreign diplomats.

On 7 July, a local newspaper wrote:

The city theatre arranged an extraordinary spectacle in the presence of the Duke of the Abruzzi. The drama The princess of Baghdad, consisting of three acts, was performed. Before the curtain was raised the orchestra had played the Italian royal anthem...

Later the duke himself wrote about his stay in Arkhangelsk: "Our departure was set for July 12. Early in the morning the church was open to us and we, although being Catholic, were allowed to join the mass. In the afternoon all the dogs were brought back on board to their kennels. In the evening the Stella Polare put out and was escorted by two steamers down the Dvina. I still remained on shore, as well as Doctor Cavalli, in order to spend the evening together with our Italian friends. Next evening we left Arkhangel’sk. During the whole journey we saw flags being hoisted to welcome us..."

Twenty men took part in the expedition, among them Captain Umberto Cagni, Lieutenant F. Querini and Doctor A. Cavalli Molinelli. They planned to go to Franz Joseph Land, in the Arctic wilderness, to establish a camp in which to stay during wintertime and, afterwards, to reach the North Pole by dogsled across the frozen sea.

Prince Luigi Amedeo established the winter camp on Rudolf Island. The expedition was to start at the end of the Arctic night. The duke lost two fingers during winter because of the cold, which made it impossible for him to join the trip by sled. He left the command over the pole expedition to Captain Cagni. Cagni barely managed to return to the camp on 23 June. On 16 August Stella Polare left Rudolf Island heading south and the expedition returned to Norway. During the expedition the northern coast of Rudolf Island and two other islands were explored and measured.

Later years
In 1906, inspired by Henry Morton Stanley's last wishes, the Duke led an expedition to the Ruwenzori Range (5,125 m), in Uganda. He scaled sixteen summits in the range, including the six principal peaks. One of them, Mount Luigi di Savoia, bears his name. The highest peak was reached on 18 June 1906.

His next great expedition, in 1909, aimed to climb K2 in Karakoram. A team led by Prince Luigi Amedeo reached a height of 6,250 m on the ridge. The standard route up the mountain (formerly known as K2's East Ridge) climbs today on the Abruzzi Spur.

In an attempt on Chogolisa he and his companions again failed to reach the summit, but set a world altitude record, a height of approximately 7,500 m (24,600 ft) before turning around just 150 m below the summit due to bad weather.

In the Italian Navy 

A vice-admiral in the Italian Royal Navy (Regia Marina), he was Inspector of Torpedo Craft from 1911 to 1912. Under the duke, the Regia Marina was responsible for saving the Army of the Kingdom of Serbia. In February 1917, he was replaced by Paolo Thaon di Revel, under pressure of the British and French allies. In February 1918, he was promoted to admiral, but played no role of importance anymore.

The Explorers Club in New York elected the duke to its highest category of membership — Honorary Member — in 1912.

The duke assisted Italian dictator Benito Mussolini with the Italo-Ethiopian Treaty of 1928. He traveled to Addis Ababa with gifts. One gift, a Fiat 3000 tank, ended up playing a role in crushing the abortive coup d'état of 1928.

In 1932, the duke was briefly the president of the newly merged Italian Line of steamships. In 1931, combining all of Italy's transatlantic carriers into the Italian Line was one of Mussolini's biggest business deals. However, the duke resigned soon after  broke down at Gibraltar. According to him, "My reason is that I have been unable to achieve harmony among executives who formerly headed competing lines."

Italian Somaliland
In 1918, the Duke returned to Italian Somaliland. In 1920, he founded the "Village of the Duke of Abruzzi" (Villaggio Duca degli Abruzzi or Villabruzzi) some ninety kilometres north of Mogadishu. It was an agricultural settlement experimenting with new cultivation techniques.

By 1926, the colony comprised 16 villages, with 3,000 Somali and 200 Italian (Italian Somalis) inhabitants. Abruzzi raised funds for a number of development projects in the town, including roads, dams, schools, hospitals, a church and a mosque.

He died in the village on 18 March 1933.

In the late 1930s the village area was one of the most socio-economically developed in eastern Africa. The area around the "Villaggio Duca degli Abruzzi" was the most agriculturally developed of Somalia before World War II and had some important food industries.

After Italian Somaliland was officially dissolved in 1947, the town was later renamed to Jowhar.

Personal life

In the early years of the twentieth century the Abruzzi was in a relationship with Katherine Hallie "Kitty" Elkins, daughter of the wealthy American senator Stephen Benton Elkins, but the Abruzzi's cousin King Victor Emmanuel III of Italy refused to grant him permission to marry a commoner. His brother, Emanuele Filiberto, to whom Luigi was very close, persuaded him to give up the relationship. His brother later approved of young Antoinette "Amber" Brizzi, the daughter of Quinto Brizzi, one of the largest vineyard owners in Northern Italy. Despite this, Abruzzi was never officially married; however, in the later years of his life, Abruzzi had a relationship and deep romantic partnership with Faduma Ali, a young Somali woman who stayed by his side even while he was on his deathbed.

Scientific works
La Stella Polare nel Mare Artico 1899-1900 (1902)
 On the "Pole Star" in the Arctic Sea (1903) by H.R.H. Luigi Amadeo of Savoy, (Duke of the Abruzzi), translated by William Le Queux, 2 vols. 
Osservazioni scientifiche, eseguite durante la spedizione polare di S.A.R. Luigi Amedeo di Savoia (1903, with Umberto Cagni and Cavalli-Molinelli)

Animal named in honor
A species of African lizard, Leptosiaphos aloysiisabaudiae, is named in honor of Prince Luigi Amedeo.

Honours

 :
 Knight of the Supreme Order of the Most Holy Annunciation, 2 May 1893
 Knight Grand Cross of the Order of Saints Maurice and Lazarus, 2 May 1893
 Knight Grand Cross of the Order of the Crown of Italy, 2 May 1893
 Commander of the Military Order of Savoy, 16 March 1913; Grand Officer, 29 December 1916; Grand Cross, 7 February 1924
 Knight of the Civil Order of Savoy
 : Knight of Honour and Devotion of the Military Order of Malta
 : Grand Cordon of the Order of the Chrysanthemum, 19 June 1895
 :
 Honorary Knight Grand Cross of the Royal Victorian Order, 21 November 1899
 Founder's Medal, 1901
 : Knight of the Royal Order of the Seraphim, 11 September 1900
  United States: Cullum Geographical Medal, 1903
  Siam: Knight of the Most Illustrious Order of the Royal House of Chakri, 2 January 1904
 : Grand Cordon of the Order of the Black Eagle, 1914
 : Grand Cross of the Royal and Distinguished Order of Charles III, with Collar, 1928

Ancestry

See also
 Picco Luigi Amedeo, a mountain in the Mont Blanc massif in the Val d'Aosta, Italy
 Savoia Peak, a peak at the northeast end of Sierra DuFief
 Luigi Island, an island in Franz Joseph Land
 Al Abraq, Libya, called by the Italians as Luigi di Savoia
 Duke of Abruzzi's Free-tailed Bat, a species of bat
 Abruzzi Secondary School, Shigar, Gilgit Baltistan
 Italian cruiser Luigi di Savoia Duca degli Abruzzi, an Italian cruiser

Notes

References
 Bridges, Peter, "A Prince of Climbers", Virginia Quarterly Review, Winter 2000

Further reading
De Filippi, La spedizione di S.A.R. il principe Luigi Amedeo di Savoia, Duca degli Abruzzi, al Monte Sant’Elia (Alaska) 1897 (1900)
Louis Amédée de Savoie (Duc des Abruzzes), Expédition de l’Étoile Polaire dans la Mer Arctique 1899–1900, Paris, coll. Polaires, Économica, 2004 (Préface de Giulia Bogliolo Bruna)

External links

 
 
 
 
 
 
 
 
 

1873 births
1933 deaths
Princes of Savoy
Nobility from Madrid
Italian explorers
Italian mountain climbers
Italian admirals
Italian military personnel of World War I
Admirals of World War I
Italian princes
Explorers of the Arctic
Somalian people of Italian descent
Italian expatriates in Somalia
Recipients of the Cullum Geographical Medal
Knights Grand Cross of the Military Order of Savoy
Knights Grand Cross of the Order of Saints Maurice and Lazarus
Recipients of the Order of the Crown (Italy)
Honorary Knights Grand Cross of the Royal Victorian Order
Sons of kings
Italian expatriates in Spain